The Treatise on the Left Emanation is a Kabbalistic text by Rabbi Isaac ha-Kohen, who with his brother Jacob traveled in Spain and Provence in the period of 1260–1280.

Scholars credit this text with being the first to present a "comprehensive concept of evil", bearing a striking resemblance to that found in Gnosticism. It is also the first to treat Samael and Lilith as a couple, likely inspiring later such depictions in the Zohar.

Isaac may be the pseudepigraphic author of other texts including the Pseudo-R. Eleazar Responsum, and the Pseudo-R. Yehushiel Responsa.

Translation 
 Professor Ronald C. Kiener, published an incomplete translation in The Early Kabbalah, New York: Paulist Press, 1986.

See also 
 Lilith
 Sitra Achra
 Moses de Leon
 Zohar

References 

Kabbalah
Treatises